The Tribe of Mic-O-Say is an honor society used by two local councils of the Boy Scouts of America, the Heart of America Council at the H. Roe Bartle Scout Reservation and, the council in which Mic-O-Say was founded in, the Pony Express Council at Camp Geiger. Similar programs exist or have existed in multiple other councils as well.  The Tribe of Mic-O-Say is not a program of the National Council of the BSA. Mic-O-Say's ceremonies, customs, and traditions are loosely based on the folklore of various tribes of Native Americans. Both councils use both the Tribe of Mic-O-Say and the Order of the Arrow.

The Kansas City Chiefs NFL team was named by Bartle, while he was mayor there, from his nickname as founder of Mic-O-Say. BSA, Mic-O-Say, and the Chiefs have been widely criticized for cultural appropriation of native tribes. Mic-O-Say was called "The Tribe of Should-be-Ashamed" and "a fake Indian Boy Scout tribe" for people who want to "play Indian".

History

Mic-O-Say was founded in 1925 at Camp Brinton near Agency, Missouri under the guidance of Harold Roe Bartle, who was the Scout executive of the St. Joseph Council, now Pony Express Council. Bartle combined his experiences in Wyoming with the St. Joseph Council's existing honor organization called Manhawka.

Bartle was inspired to create the organization after serving as the Scout Executive for the Cheyenne Council of the Boy Scouts of America in Casper, Wyoming, from 1923 to 1925. Bartle became interested in the heritage and culture of the many Indian reservations in Wyoming. He spent many hours listening to stories about the Indian tribes and soon began to incorporate Indian values and ideals into his Scouting program. Bartle was inducted into a local tribe of Arapaho based on a reservation served by the Scout council, and according to traditional Mic-O-Say legend, was given the name Lone Bear by the Chief.

Bartle started as Scout Executive in St. Joseph, January 1925. The idea of Mic-O-Say was well formed from the moment he arrived. There already existed a camp society there called Manhawka, established by a previous executive. Bartle familiarized himself with the rudiments of it, and incorporated them into his central theme of an Indian-like society based on the principles of the Scout Oath. Bartle named the society "Micosay". A hyphenated version was used shortly after and remains popular, though the non-hyphenated version can still be used.

Camp Geiger, which succeeded Camp Brinton in 1935, is considered the mother Tribe of Mic-O-Say. Bartle was "The Chief", and conducted all the early ceremonies personally, placing a single eagle claw around the neck of each new member and bestowing their Tribal Name upon them. He built up the tribe during the next few years.

In late 1928, Bartle became the Scout executive of the Kansas City Area Council. Mic-O-Say had increased both Scouting and summer camp attendance, and he established another Mic-O-Say program at Camp Dan Sayre near Noel, Missouri, in 1929, the first summer there. Another honor program known as the 4Ms existed there at the time. In 1930 Camp Osceola opened near Osceola, Missouri, and was renamed the H. Roe Bartle Scout Reservation.

The tribe flourished and expanded rapidly at both Camps. The mother tribe in St. Joseph remained and grew.  In 2014 the 20,000th tribesman was inducted into the Camp Geiger tribe.

The 75th anniversary celebration of the program at the H. Roe Bartle Scout Reservation included thousands of members of the Tribe, including previous Chief Scout Executives.

Organization

In the Heart of America Council, the Council of Chieftains, She-She-Be Council, and Tribal Council lead the tribe. Their official publications are the Customs and Traditions booklet, Cedar Smoke newsletter, and Inner Circle magazines.

In the Pony Express Council, the Council of Chieftains and the Tribal Council lead the tribe. Their official publications are the Redbook and most recently Make Talk Now which is an electronic video version of the former Make Talk magazine.

Notable members
 Harold Roe Bartle, former Mayor of Kansas City
 Sam Graves, U.S. Congressman from Missouri's 6th Congressional District, having achieved the rank of Runner as a youth and elevated in 2009 to Sachem at Camp Geiger.  
 Todd Graves, former US Attorney, was elevated in June 2016 to Chieftain at Camp Geiger having served in all ranks and paint stations.
Arliss Howard, actor playing Private Cowboy in Full Metal Jacket, wearing his Brave Pouch in various scenes
Robert Mazzuca, Chief Scout Executive of BSA from 2007 to 2012
Ike Skelton, former U.S. Congressman from Missouri's 4th congressional district, 34 year member of the United States House of Representatives, and former Chair of the House Armed Services Committee
Michael B. Surbaugh was an Honorary Chief from 2016
Roy Williams, Chief Scout Executive of BSA from 2000 to 2007

Controversy
The Boy Scouts of America, and particularly Mic-O-Say, have been widely criticized by officials of several native tribes, anthropologists, journalists, and professors for being a patently offensive cultural appropriation of tribal identity and sacred practices. It was called "a fake Indian Boy Scout tribe" for people who want to "play Indian". Robert Prue, a former scout and a professor of social work at the University of Missouri-Kansas City, doubts some of Harold Roe Bartle's historical origin claims, and rejects his claim of having become a tribal member in Wyoming, as being merely the affinity of one tribal member instead of the requisite authority of each entire tribe being depicted. Critics say that the appropriation continues because the BSA has not yet received widespread public revulsion like professional sports teams have. That includes the Kansas City Chiefs, named after Bartle's nickname from the founding of Mic-O-Say, and which has its own cultural appropriation and racism controversy.

In 2015, representatives of several native tribes from the American Indian Health Research and Education Alliance met with Mic-O-Say leadership and published a five-page article in Practicing Anthropology called "For $1,000 You Can Be a Dog Soldier: The Tribe of Should-be-Ashamed". It summarized: "The Mic-O-Say have a long history of misappropriating and misrepresenting Indian culture and traditions as well as engaging in cultural imperialism. This alienates Native people from their traditions, undermines self-determination, and creates further animosity and distrust between Natives and non-Natives."

See also
 Scouting in Kansas
 Scouting in Missouri
 Order of the Arrow
 Firecrafter
 Wolfeboro Pioneers
 Tribe of Tahquitz

References

Further reading

External links

 

Associations related to the Boy Scouts of America
Organizations based in Missouri
Organizations established in 1925
1925 establishments in Missouri